The former Lewis Tompkins Hose Company No. 1 Firehouse, sometimes known as 5/33, was the first built in what later became the city of Beacon, New York. Designed by Schuyler Tillman and Benjamin Hall in a Second Empire style, it was completed in 1893. It is located at 162 Main Street, a block away from NY 9D, and was listed on the National Register of Historic Places on December 6, 2004.

History

Lewis Tompkins
Lewis Tompkins, was born at the family farm near Ashland (Greene County), August 5, 1836. Tompkins was descended from an old English family and related to Daniel D. Tompkins, vice-president of the United States from 1816 to 1820. When he was about seventeen, he began to learn the trade of hat finishing with Strong & Ruggles, of Ashland. In the summer of 1860 he went to Matteawan, where he was employed for with the Seamless Clothing Manufacturing Co.; later he was in business as a clothier at Fishkill-on-the-Hudson. In 1873 he built a large hat factory near the river at Fishkill-on-the-Hudson, and Dutchess Hat Works was put into successful operation. The business grew and a branch was established at Tioronda, a mile away. He became the leading manufacturer of wool hats in the United States, and at his death his fortune amounted to several hundred thousand dollars.

He was greatly interested in local progress and was a member of the board of education at Matteawan, and was at one time president of the village of Fishkill-on-the-Hudson. It was largely through his endeavors that Matteawan and Fishkill-on-the-Hudson secured new school buildings. One feature of his enterprise was the erection of homes for his employees. The building of the hose house of the Lewis Tompkins Hose Co. was chiefly due to him. Highland Hospital was a charity which he supported. The family residence is appropriately named ' Edgewater, " being situated on the bank of the Hudson opposite 
Newburgh, and commanded a lovely view up and down the river. He died at his home on the 9th day of January, 1894.

Lewis Tompkins Hose Company
Beacon Engine Company was organized in the Village of Matteawan on October 5, 1886. In the winter of 1886 in the village of Fishkill Landing, Beacon's second fire company, the Lewis Tompkins Hose Company was organized. Much of the funding came from Lewis Tompkins, who owned the Dutchess Hat Works in Fishkill Landing. The first piece of rolling stock to be used by the company was an 1886 hand drawn hose cart which soon outlived its usefulness. Upon the death of Tompkins in 1894, members of the company decided to name it in his honor.

The 1886 hand drawn hose cart apparatus was replaced in 1903 with a horse-drawn wagon. This wagon was drawn by Ben, a large greyish-white horse that served for fifteen years before retiring. Tompkins Hose the only Fire Company in either Fishkill-on-the-Hudson or Matteawan to own a firehorse, while the others companies had to obtain one as needed from one of the local stables. Ben was replaced in 1918 when the company became the proud possessor of a shiny red Ahrens-Fox fire engine. Ben was later buried in Glenham.

Tompkins Hose Firehouse
In 1885, Tompkins Hose Firehouse was built at 162 Main Street in Fishkill Landing. A two-story building, it featured a tower and fire bell. At a special election held December 19, 1905 Village voters approved a bond resolution to fund the construction of a third story to the firehouse.
 
Tompkins Hose Company re-located to new quarters at 13 South Avenue in 1982. The old firehouse was taken out of service, and hosted a number of local not-for-profit agencies before being redeveloped into a glass studio. The building is a contributing property to the Lower Main Street Historic District.

Re-development
On April 8, 2005 Dutchess County Executive William R. Steinhaus announced an award for a local business, Hudson Beach Glass, of Beacon in the form of a low interest business loan in the amount of $300,000. The loan was part of an economic development project under Dutchess County's Community Development Block Grant Program (CDBG). CDBG funding is provided through the U.S. Department of Housing and Urban Development. County Executive Steinhaus said, “The development of the property not only enhances the Main Street in Beacon but will provide additional job opportunities to individuals that are low to moderate income.” County Executive Steinhaus added, “This project is a tremendous asset to the west end of Beacon’s Main Street. The retail showroom and glass workshop complement Beacon’s growing small business and arts culture.”

Michael Benzer and John Gilvey, partners in a studio line of art glass giftware, Hudson Beach Glass, purchased a property at 162 Main Street in Beacon NY, in the West End Historic District, that originally was Tompkins Hose Firehouse." Beacon City Mayor, Clara Lou Gould stated, “The Hudson Beacon Glass restoration of the historic Lewis Tompkins Hose Firehouse, a very visible building in the West End Historic District which is on the National Register, preserves an important part of the city's history. The use of the building to display and sell quality hand-crafted glass products is an attraction for both residents and visitors." On September 8, 2008 a plaque was placed on the old firehouse honoring the members of the Lewis Tompkins Hose Co.

See also

National Register of Historic Places listings in Dutchess County, New York

References

Defunct fire stations in New York (state)
Fire stations on the National Register of Historic Places in New York (state)
National Register of Historic Places in Dutchess County, New York
Fire stations completed in 1893
Beacon, New York
Historic district contributing properties in New York (state)